Pedra  (stone) is a city located in the state of Pernambuco, Brazil.

Geography
 State - Pernambuco
 Region - Agreste Pernambucano
 Boundaries - Arcoverde and Pesqueira   (N);  Águas Belas    (S);  Caetés, Paranatama and Venturosa   (E);   Buique   (W)
 Area - 803.02 km2
 Elevation - 593 m
 Hydrography - Ipanema River
 Vegetation - Caatinga Hipoxerófila
 Climate - Semi arid - hot
 Annual average temperature - 22.9 c
 Distance to Recife - 255.4 km

Economy
The main economic activities in Pedra are based in commerce and  agribusiness, especially manioc, beans, tomatoes, corn; and livestock such as cattle, pigs, sheep, goats, horses and chickens.

Economic indicators

Economy by Sector
2006

Health indicators

References

Municipalities in Pernambuco